Cartha Dekle DeLoach (July 20, 1920 – March 13, 2013), known as Deke DeLoach, was deputy associate director of the Federal Bureau of Investigation (FBI) of the United States. During his post, DeLoach was the third most senior official in the FBI after J. Edgar Hoover and Clyde Tolson.

Early life
DeLoach was born July 20, 1920 in Claxton, Georgia, the only child of Cartha Calhoun DeLoach. His father, a merchant, died when DeLoach was ten years old. He attended Gordon Military College, South Georgia College and Stetson University.

FBI service
In his book, “The Secrets of the FBI” national security journalist Ronald Kessler reported an incident in which a highly-placed congressional staffer believed that DeLoach attempted blackmail using derogatory information from the agency's files.:
Roy L. Elson, administrative assistant to U.S. Sen. Carl T. Hayden, experienced [FBI blackmail] first-hand. FBI Director J. Edgar Hoover wanted an additional appropriation for the new FBI building on Pennsylvania Avenue. Elson had reservations about the request, but Cartha D. “Deke” DeLoach, one of the FBI’s top officials, met with him and “hinted” that he had “information that was unflattering and detrimental to my marital situation and that the senator might be disturbed,” Elson told me for my book.

“I was certainly vulnerable that way,” Elson said. “The implication was there was information about my sex life. There was no doubt in my mind what he was talking about.”

Elson suggested that they both tell Hayden, who headed the Senate Appropriations Committee, about his affair.

“Bring the photos if you have them,” Elson told DeLoach.

“At that point,” Elson recalled, “He started backing off … He said, ‘I’m only joking. Bullshit,' ” Elson said. “I interpreted it as attempted blackmail.”

References

External links
Booknotes interview with DeLoach on Hoover's FBI: The Inside Story by Hoover's Trusted Lieutenant, August 20, 1995.
Remembering ‘Deke’ DeLoach, FBI
 FBI:  Obituary

1920 births
2013 deaths
Federal Bureau of Investigation executives
PepsiCo people
People from Claxton, Georgia
Stetson University alumni
Kennedy administration personnel
Lyndon B. Johnson administration personnel
Nixon administration personnel